Jacob William Ryan (born February 27, 1992) is a former American football inside linebacker. He played college football at Michigan. He was drafted by the Green Bay Packers in the fourth round of the 2015 NFL Draft.

High school career
In high school, Ryan was rated as the 30th best high school football inside linebacker in the country by Rivals.com. He was rated as the 60th and 81st best outside linebacker in the national class of 2010 by ESPN.com and Scout.com, respectively. He was regarded as the 34th best player in the state of Ohio by Rivals. Ryan was a participant in the Ohio North–South All-Star game. He recovered the onside kick to secure the Ohio High School Athletic Association (OHSAA) championship as a junior. Ryan had offers from Ball State, Toledo and a number of other Mid-American Conference, but he grew  and  prior to his senior year. Since Saint Ignatius High School has many Michigan Wolverine alumni, Ryan suspects that sudden late interest from Michigan was prompted by one of them.

College career

Ryan redshirted his freshman year for the 2010 Michigan Wolverines football team. As a redshirt freshman, he started in the September 3 opener for the 2011 team against Western Michigan as a result of a back injury to Cam Gordon.  In the game, Ryan deflected a pass that was intercepted and returned for a touchdown. He went on to start 11 games and play in all 13. On September 24, 2011 against new head coach Brady Hoke's former team, San Diego State, Ryan had two fumble recoveries.  His first career quarterback sack came on October 1 in the Little Brown Jug rivalry game against Minnesota. It was his only sack that year until the final game of the season. In the January 3, 2012 Sugar Bowl 23–20 overtime victory against Virginia Tech, Ryan had 4 tackles for a loss, including one sack and one 22-yard loss by David Wilson. During the game, he had his season-high 7 tackles (6 solo). For the season, he earned 2011 Big Ten All-Freshman team recognition from both ESPN.com and BTN.com as well as 2011 Rivals.com 2nd team All-Freshman and College Football News All-Freshman honorable mention honors. Ryan finished among the conference leaders in tackles for a loss/game (.85, t-15th).

Prior to the second game of the 2012 season against Air Force, Ryan's number was changed from 90 to 47 following a ceremony for Bennie Oosterbaan in which his retired number was placed back into circulation as a Michigan Football Legend jersey. On October 13, Ryan was selected as Big Ten Defensive player of the week when he posted a career-high 11 tackles (3.5 for a loss and 1.5 sacks). Ryan was named an All-Big Ten second-team selection by the media and an honorable mention selection by the coaches.

During Spring practice in 2013, Ryan tore his anterior cruciate ligament. When Ryan was initially injured in the spring, there was no official diagnosis of his expected return to football, but ACL injuries typically require a year to fully heal. By August Ryan was expected to return to the field in mid October. On August 25, 2013, he was named one of four team co-captains along with Taylor Lewan, Courtney Avery, and Cam Gordon. Ryan was cleared to play by doctors on October 7, ahead of the October 12 contest against Penn State.

Ryan entered the 2014 season on the preseason watchlists for the Bronko Nagurski Trophy, Butkus Award, Lombardi Award, and Bednarik Award. Ryan was a late addition to the Lott IMPACT Trophy watch list. In the offseason, Michigan announced that Ryan would be moving to middle linebacker. In the September 6 Michigan–Notre Dame football rivalry game, Ryan tied his career high with 11 tackles against Notre Dame. On October 13, Ryan was recognized as Big Ten co-Defensive Player of the Week (along with Damien Wilson) after recording 10 tackles (3 for a loss) against Penn State on October 11. On October 27, Ryan became one of 15 semifinalists for the Butkus Award. On November 3, Ryan was again recognized as Big Ten co-Defensive Player of the Week (along with Louis Trinca-Pasat) after recording 11 tackles (2.5 for a loss and 2 forced fumbles) against Indiana on November 1. On November 24, Ryan was named one of five finalist for the Butkus Award. Following the regular season, he was named first-team All-Big Ten by both the coaches and the media. He was an honorable mention selection to the 2014 College Football All-America Team by Sports Illustrated. He won The Roger Zatkoff Award as the team's top linebacker in 2012, 2013, and 2014.

College statistics

Professional career
On December 13, 2014, it was announced that Ryan had accepted his invitation to play in the 2015 East–West Shrine Game. On January 17, 2015, Ryan attended the East–West Shrine Game and recorded five combined tackles, a tackle for a loss, and one sack as part of Mike Singletary's East team that defeated the North 19–3. He was one of 34 collegiate linebackers to attend the 2015 NFL Scouting Combine in Indianapolis, Indiana. Ryan completed all of the combine drills and finished fifth among all participating linebackers in the three-cone drill, tied for sixth in the short shuttle, and finished eighth in the 40-yard dash. On March 12, 2015, Ryan attended Michigan's pro day, but opted to stand on his combine numbers and only perform positional drills for scouts and team representatives from 18 NFL teams. During the pre-draft process, Ryan attended a private visit with the Miami Dolphins. At the conclusion of the pre-draft process, Ryan was projected to be a fourth or fifth round pick by NFL draft experts and scouts. He was ranked the 12th best outside linebacker prospect in the draft by NFLDraftScout.com and was ranked the 15th best outside linebacker by ESPN.

Green Bay Packers

2015
The Green Bay Packers selected Ryan in the fourth round (129th overall) of the 2015 NFL Draft. He was the 15th linebacker drafted in 2015.

On May 7, 2015, the Green Bay Packers signed Ryan to a four-year, $2.73 million contract that includes a signing bonus of $456,678.

Throughout training camp, Ryan competed for a job as a starting inside linebacker after they were left vacant after the release of A. J. Hawk and Brad Jones. He competed against Clay Matthews III, Sam Barrington, Nate Palmer, Joe Thomas, and Carl Bradford. Head coach Mike McCarthy named Ryan the fourth inside linebacker on the depth chart behind Clay Matthews, Sam Barrington, and Nate Palmer to begin the regular season.

He made his professional regular season debut in the Green Bay Packers' season-opener at the Chicago Bears and recorded one solo tackle during their 31–23 victory. Ryan was promoted to the third inside linebacker after Sam Barrington suffered a season-ending foot injury during the game. In Week 3, Ryan recorded a solo tackle on special teams as the Packers defeated the Kansas City Chiefs 38–28. He left the game in the third quarter after sustaining a hamstring injury and was sidelined for the next two games (Weeks 4–5). On November 8, 2015, Ryan recorded a season-high ten combined tackles during a 37–29 loss at the Carolina Panthers. In Week 10, Ryan made his first career start after defensive coordinator Dom Capers elected to start him at inside linebacker over Nate Palmer. He recorded a season-high tying ten combined tackles in the Packers' 27–23 win at the Detroit Lions. He remained the starting inside linebacker with Clay Matthews for the last five games of the season. Pro Football Focus gave Ryan an overall grade of 42.5 for his rookie season. His overall grade was poor due to his issues with pass coverage.

The Green Bay Packers finished second in the NFC North with a 10–6 record and received a playoff berth. On January 10, 2016, Ryan started his first career playoff games and recorded five combined tackles in a 35–18 victory at the Washington Redskins in the NFC Wildcard game. They were eliminated after being defeated 26–20 in overtime by the Arizona Cardinals in the NFC Divisional round.

2016
During open practices and organized team activities, Ryan and rookie Blake Martinez impressed coaches by developing a rapport and chemistry while they both received first-team at inside linebacker. They were dubbed by "Jake and Blake" by fans, a play on "Shake and Bake", a catchphrase of popularized by the film Talladega Nights: The Ballad of Ricky Bobby. Ryan was named the starting inside linebacker with Blake Martinez to start the regular season, with Clay Matthews moving back to starting outside linebacker with Nick Perry.

He started the Green Bay Packers' season-opener at the Jacksonville Jaguars and made seven combined tackles and his first career pass deflection during their 27–23 victory. In Week 9, Ryan recorded a season-high 12 combined tackles and broke up a pass as the Packers lost to the Indianapolis Colts 31–26.
On November 13, Ryan suffered an ankle injury during a 47–25 loss at the Tennessee Titans missed the next two games. Ryan finished the  season with a career-high 82 combined tackles (57 solo) and three pass deflections in 14 games and ten starts. He received an overall grade of 76.4 from Pro Football Focus and was ranked their third most improved second year Player.

The Green Bay Packers finished atop their division with a 10–6 record and received a playoff berth. On January 8, 2017, Ryan recorded 12 combined tackles and a career-high three pass break ups in the Packers' 38–13 win against the New York Giants in the NFC Wildcard game. After defeating the Dallas Cowboys in the NFC Divisional round, the Green Bay Packers lost 44–21 at the Atlanta Falcons in the NFC Championship. In the loss to the Falcons, Ryan had four total tackles.

2017
Ryan and Martinez returned as the starting inside linebackers to begin the 2017 regular season. He was sidelined for a Week 3 win against the Cincinnati Bengals after sustaining a hamstring injury and concussion the previous week. December 3, 2017, Ryan recorded ten combined tackles and made his first career sack on Tampa Bay Buccaneers' quarterback Jameis Winston during a 26–20 victory. In Week 16, Ryan collected a season-high 11 combined tackles in the Packers' 16–0 loss to the Minnesota Vikings. He finished the  season with 81 combined tackles (52 solo) and a sack in 15 games and 12 starts. Pro Football Focus gave Ryan an overall grade of 82.1, which ranked 19th among all qualified linebackers in 2017. The Green Bay Packers did not qualify for the playoffs after they finished third in the NFC North with a 7–9 record. Offensive coordinator Edgar Bennett and defensive coordinator Dom Capers were both fired at the end of the season.

2018
On July 30, 2018, Ryan suffered a knee injury in training camp and was carted off the field. On August 1, an MRI revealed that he suffered a torn ACL, keeping him out the rest of the year.

Jacksonville Jaguars
On March 19, 2019, Ryan signed with the Jacksonville Jaguars. He was placed on the reserve/non-football injury list on August 31, 2019 to start the season. He was activated on November 30, 2019. He was placed back on injured reserve on December 10, 2019.

On February 24, 2020, the Jaguars declined the option on Ryan's contract, making him a free agent.

Baltimore Ravens
Ryan signed with the Baltimore Ravens on May 4, 2020. He was released on June 11 with a non-football injury designation.

NFL career statistics

Regular season

Postseason

Personal life
Ryan comes from a family of football players: older brother Connor (wide receiver) and younger brother Zack (linebacker) played for Ball State; father, Tim, was a wide receiver at Wake Forest (1980–84); maternal grandfather, Francis E. Sweeney, an Ohio Supreme Court justice, played defensive tackle for Xavier as well as in the Canadian Football League. Ryan is Catholic.

References

External links

Green Bay Packers bio
Michigan Wolverines bio 
Ryan at NCAA
Ryan at CBS Sports
Ryan at ESPN.com
Ryan archive at Michigan Daily
Ryan archive at AnnArbor.com

1992 births
Living people
American football linebackers
Baltimore Ravens players
Green Bay Packers players
Jacksonville Jaguars players
Michigan Wolverines football players
People from Fairview, Ohio
People from Westlake, Ohio
Players of American football from Ohio
Sportspeople from Cuyahoga County, Ohio